The Little Match Girl Passion is a choral work by David Lang, based on the 1845 Hans Christian Andersen story, "The Little Match Girl". It is influenced by Johann Sebastian Bach’s St Matthew Passion (1727) and won the Pulitzer Prize for Music in 2008. 

The first performance was given at Carnegie Hall on 27 October 2007 with the Theatre of Voices conducted by Paul Hillier. It is scored for chamber choir and four solo singers (SATB) who also play simple percussion. A recording was issued by French record label Harmonia Mundi in August 2009.

Program note 
In his program note, David Lang writes:

Reception 
In 2019, writers of The Guardian ranked The Little Match Girl Passion the 15th greatest work of art music since 2000, with Andrew Clements calling it "one of the most original vocal works of recent times. Extracts from Andersen’s story and from St Matthew’s gospel are interleaved with closely woven vocal writing, that is [...] often comfortingly tonal and hauntingly affecting." The Little Match Girl Passion has been described as "a 21st century classic".

References 

Compositions by David Lang
2009 compositions
Pulitzer Prize for Music-winning works
Music based on works by Hans Christian Andersen
Works based on The Little Match Girl